Tom Miller (born 3 July 1928) is  a former Australian rules footballer who played with Footscray in the Victorian Football League (VFL).

Notes

External links 		
		
		
		
		
		
		
Living people		
1928 births		
		
Australian rules footballers from Victoria (Australia)		
Western Bulldogs players
Oakleigh Football Club players